Vincenzo Amato (2 June 1881 in Taranto – 2 March 1963 in Catania) was an Italian mathematician.

References

 Biography at SISM

1881 births
1963 deaths
20th-century Italian mathematicians
People from Taranto